The Elkhart River is a  tributary of the St. Joseph River in northern Indiana in the United States.  It is almost entirely contained in Elkhart County.  It begins as the South Branch Elkhart River from Port Mitchell Lake and the North Branch Elkhart River from Waldron Lake and merge to form the Elkhart River west of Wawaka, Indiana.  It flows generally westward through Benton and then turns northward.  It then flows through Baintertown and Waterford Mills into the Goshen Dam Pond.  From there it flows northwest through Goshen, Dunlap and Elkhart.  It flows into the St. Joseph River at Island Park just north of downtown Elkhart.

See also
List of rivers of Indiana

References

Further reading
Kellan R.S. (2013). Flood-Inundation Maps for the Elkhart River at Goshen, Indiana  Reston, Va.: U.S. Department of the Interior, U.S. Geological Survey.

External links

Rivers of Elkhart County, Indiana
Rivers of Indiana